Richard "Rigo" Kuthan (3 July 1891 – 10 February 1958) was an Austrian international footballer.

References

1891 births
1958 deaths
Association football forwards
Austrian footballers
Austria international footballers
SK Rapid Wien players
Place of birth missing